Andrey Arkhipov (Russian: Андрей Архипов; 21 April 1931 – 12 January 2017) was a Russian rower who represented the Soviet Union. He competed at the 1956 Summer Olympics in Melbourne with the men's coxed four where they were eliminated in the semi-final.

References

1931 births
2017 deaths
Russian male rowers
Olympic rowers of the Soviet Union
Rowers at the 1956 Summer Olympics